Lamluda is a village in the Jebel Akhdar region of Libya.

Lamluda is on the cross-roads of several roads in northern Cyrenaica:
It's connected with Martuba by two roads, the northern one (through Derna) is a part of the Libyan Coastal Highway; the southern one is the desert one.

Populated places in Derna District